MVEE can refer to:

 MV & EE - a modern group of musicians
Military Vehicles and Engineering Establishment - British defence research unit
Multi-variant Execution Environment - a way of executing computer programs to improve security